Keyserling is the surname of several members of the noble House of Keyserlingk:

 Alexander Keyserling (1815–1891), Russian geologist, paleontologist, botanist and zoologist
 Eugen von Keyserling (1833–1889), German arachnologist
 Hermann Graf Keyserling (1880–1946), German philosopher
 Eduard von Keyserling (1855–1918), German writer
 H.H. Keyserling (1866-1944), Russian naval officer, mariner and whaler in the Far East 
 Leon Keyserling (1908–1987), American economist
 Arnold Keyserling (1922–2005), German philosopher, son of Hermann.

See also 
 Kayserling

German-language surnames
German noble families